Roth Capital Partners, LLC is a small privately held investment banking company with headquarters in Newport Beach, California. It specialises in providing services to small cap publicly listed companies.

History 
In 1977 Walter Cruttenden III founded Capital Data Bank, a system that matched private companies with private investors by computer. Under Cruttenden's chairmanship that company grew into Cruttenden & Co. and began offering brokerage services in 1984. Byron Roth joined in 1992 and bought a 15% share of the company. He became president in 1994, upon which the company was renamed Cruttenden Roth.

Byron Roth became CEO in 1997 and retained that post when he became chairman on Cruttenden's resignation in November 1998. Initially described as an amicable departure, in July 1999 Roth sued Cruttenden for stealing the company's clients and employees. In February 2000 the firm changed its name to Roth Capital Partners, Inc.

Between 2003 and 2010 about 350 Chinese companies gained listings in US stock markets through reverse takeovers and in August 2010, Barron's reported that Roth's promotional materials claimed that it had pioneered the practice of PIPE financing and had helped raise over $2.8 billion for 67 Chinese companies listed on the U.S. markets.

By 2012 the company had scaled back its operations in China after investors lost faith in Chinese reverse takeover deals, predominantly due to a series of corporate-accounting scandals.

Conferences
The company has organized annual conferences since 1988. Held in Orange County, California their purpose is to facilitate small public companies make pitches to institutional investors. The conferences feature lavish evening entertainments which have featured exotic sets, scantily clad dancers, and performers such as Snoop Dogg and The Pussycat Dolls, and they have sometimes been criticised for this, being compared to the lavish parties of Drexel Burnham Lambert's of the mid-1980s.

In 2006, Byron Roth reported that although an event costs the company around $2.5 million to stage, they usually pay for themselves. The New York Post reported in February 2007 that Roth had hosted clients at an event where the primary feature was "several dozen" topless Asian models with the ticker symbols of the companies Roth underwrote body-painted on, and in August 2011, Reuters published a similar report about that year's conference.

The 2018 conference was attended by 1,000 invited investors and 500 companies, with entertainment from Migos and Pat Benatar. By the end of this conference, it was reported that since 2011, Roth's conferences had raised funding greater than $1 million for the Challenged Athletes Foundation, an organization which helps those with physical challenges gain and maintain access to sports.

Criticism 
In 1998 the Los Angeles Times reported that Roth had been criticized for its underwriting practices, citing the company's role in the initial public offering of Aviation Distributors Inc., which later faced multiple shareholder lawsuits alleging the company had manipulated its revenues in order to boost the company's stock price.  The company initially went public at $5 per share and later traded as high at $12.88 per share before falling to just 97 cents per share following the announcement of the lawsuits.

In 2010 Barron's cited questions that had been raised by investors about Orient Paper, China Natural Gas and China Green Agriculture, firms underwritten by Roth, and which were later investigated for fraud by the SEC.

The Washington Post reported in September 2013 that Roth had been involved in the initial public offering of China Electric Motor Company (NASDAQ: CELM) following its reverse takeover in 2010. Roth issued five 'buy' ratings on the stock. However, about a year later, CELM delayed its regulatory filings, trading in the stock was halted and the company's auditor resigned. In October 2011, CELM was delisted and several lawsuits were filed.

The company was featured in the 2017 financial documentary The China Hustle for its underwriting relationships with Chinese companies that led to losses for American stockholders.

See also
 List of investment banks
 Microcap stock

References

External links
ROTH Capital Partners, LLC corporate website

Investment banks in the United States